Vardetangen is a point in Austrheim Municipality in Vestland county, Norway. This place is notable in that it is the westernmost mainland point in Norway proper. The point is located on the mainland Lindås peninsula, jutting out into the Fensfjorden.

References

Austrheim
Landforms of Vestland
Headlands of Norway